is a science fiction manga series written and illustrated by Yukinobu Hoshino and originally serialized in Futabasha's Monthly Super Action starting from June 1984. It was then collected into three bound volumes by Futabasha, released between August 18, 1985 and October 24, 1986. The series was licensed for an English-language release by Viz Media and published in North America starting in 1990. 2001 Nights is largely inspired by classic hard science fiction, with many visual homages to previous science fiction novels and films.

Media

Manga 
2001 Nights consists of several loosely connected short stories, all taking place in the same timeline, with the whole series spanning several hundred years. Many of the stories are related to each other (even across books), each building upon the achievements of the previous ones. The stories are often (but not always) scientifically plausible, recalling much of the early science fiction of the 1950s and 1960s.

Anime

2001 Nights 
2001 Nights was adapted into a one-episode original video animation (OVA) under the name Space Fantasia 2001 Nights by TMS Entertainment and released on VHS on June 21, 1987. It has not been licensed in English, though versions with English subtitles can be found.

TO 
Two stories from 2001 Nights, Night 12 ("Symbiotic Planet") and Night 14 ("Elliptical Orbit") respectively, were adapted into TO, a two-episode computer animation (CGI) original video animation (OVA). Fumihiko Sori directed. It was released on DVD and Blu-ray by Avex in December 2009, in Japan. TO was released on rental DVDs on October 2, 2009 and in December 2009 as regular DVD and Blu-ray release. It was scheduled to air on TBS and BS-TBS (Japanese satellite TV broadcaster) in November and December 2009, prior to the DVD and Blu-ray release. A 10-minute trailer was released on YouTube by Avex on November 11, 2009. Manga Entertainment a UK distributor acquired licensing in late 2010. Funimation licensed To for North American release in 2011.

Stories
The stories that make up the complete manga are placed in chronological order, with two exceptions. By the technology used, Night 14 ("Elliptical Orbit") seems to belong somewhere between Nights 6 and 7 (after the invention of suspended animation and interstellar travel, but before the Lucifer discovery). The second, Night 6 ("Discovery") is referenced in Night 4 ("Posterity") which occurs 20 years after the launch of the probe Discovery.

Volume list

Reception

Reviewing the manga Mark Aragona praised Hoshino's skill in striking a balance between the scientific and the fantastical elements in his stories, noting the opus of Lucifer Rising. Harry Knowles of Ain't It Cool News praised the work for its portrayal, but overcomes its inspiration One Thousand and One Nights and 2001: A Space Odyssey, noting "It is reminiscent of the classics and develops its science fiction well enough on its own that is not diminished by comparisons."

Anime-focus.com reviewed the TO OVA and offered a mixed review of the work. While praising the graphics and special effects, it focused on the emotionless Funimation English dub which made all the worse by lifeless characters and the lack of attachment to the stories. Closing with, "This should have been a gem but the flaws are too great to make this the masterpiece it could have been." Charles Packer, found the same flaws in his review, "Whilst the disc may look eye watering spectacular, it’s difficult to get over the fact that the stories rely too heavily on clichés."

References

External links
 Official 2001 Ya Monogatari OVA website  
 TO OVA website 
 

1984 manga
1987 anime OVAs
2009 anime OVAs
Funimation
Futabasha manga
Science fiction anime and manga
Seinen manga
Viz Media manga